General Dwight Edward Beach (July 20, 1908 – July 22, 2000) commanded the United States Forces Korea from 1965–1966 and U.S. Army, Pacific from September 1966 to July 1968. He gained his commission in 1932 into the Field Artillery. He served in World War II in the Pacific theater, participating in four amphibious assaults, as well as in the Korean War.

Biography
Beach was born in Chelsea, Michigan, on July 20, 1908, and attended the University of Michigan for two years before transferring and graduating from the United States Military Academy. Prior to transferring to West Point, he was initiated into the Sigma Chi fraternity. He also attended the Armed Forces Staff College and the Army War College, and was later an instructor of tactics at West Point.

Major command assignments for Beach include Commanding General, 45th Infantry Division, of the Eighth Army in Korea in 1954. Later he served as Commanding General for the 82nd Airborne Division at Fort Bragg. During the escalation of U.S. involvement in Vietnam, he served as Commanding General for the U.S. Army Combat Developments Command in Fort Belvoir, Virginia, and then as Commander in Chief of the United Nations Command, Commander of U.S. Forces in Korea and Commanding General of the Eighth Army in Korea.

Additional major duty assignments for Beach were Deputy Chief of Staff and Chief of Staff for the Eighth Army in Korea, and Director of Special Weapons Development at Fort Bliss, Texas. He later served as Deputy Chief and Chief of Research and Development for the Department of the Army in Washington, D.C.

He retired from the Army on August 1, 1968. He was married to the former Florence Eileen Clem (1912–1995) in 1932, and had five children. He died in Lima Township, Michigan, at the 147-year-old Beach Farm.

Awards and decoration
Awards and decorations for General Beach include the Army Distinguished Service Medal, the Silver Star, the Legion of Merit, the Bronze Star, the World War II Victory Medal, the Occupation of Japan Medal, the Korean Service Medal, the United Nations Service Medal, and the Philippine Liberation Ribbon.

  Distinguished Service Medal with Oak Leaf Cluster
  Silver Star
  Legion of Merit
  Bronze Star
  World War II Victory Medal
  Army of Occupation Medal with Japan clasp
  Korean Service Medal
  United Nations Service Medal for Korea
  Philippine Liberation Medal

Dwight E. Beach Middle School, in Chelsea, Michigan, is named for him.

Notes

References

External links
 

1908 births
2000 deaths
People from Chelsea, Michigan
United States Army generals
United States Military Academy alumni
Recipients of the Distinguished Service Medal (US Army)
Recipients of the Silver Star
Recipients of the Legion of Merit
United States Army personnel of World War II
Military personnel from Michigan
University of Michigan alumni
Commanders, United States Forces Korea